Van Burnham (born June 28, 1971) is an American writer, designer, producer, and curator. She is the author of Supercade: A Visual History of the Videogame Age (MIT Press) and former contributing editor of Wired. Burnham curated the games component of Beyond the Streets and wrote the essay “Graffiti x Games” for the catalog, exploring the relationship between videogames and street art. She also curated and produced the ARCADIA exhibition for Soho House, launched in West Hollywood.

Burnham resides in Los Angeles, California where she stewards the Supercade private arcade museum.

Books

References

External links
 Supercade
 Arcade Wasteland

Living people
American non-fiction writers
1971 births
Video game writers
Writers from Los Angeles
People from Raleigh, North Carolina